Chrysostomos Michailidis (born 15 January 1975) is a Greek former professional footballer who played as a goalkeeper. He is the current goalkeeper coach of AEK Athens B.

Club career
Michailidis was born on January 15, 1975, in Ptolemaida and started at Eordaikos where he played for five years, before transferring to AEK Athens in 1997. In AEK he was purely a substitute goalkeeper in his first seasons with the team, while in December 2001, he was loaned to Ethnikos Asteras. The following season was his best at AEK, where he played in most matches as a starter, while also playing in several matches during the 2004–05 season, as an alternative to Dionysis Chiotis. With AEK Michailidis won the Greek cup in 2000, before leaving the club after 8 seasons on their roster, in the summer of 2005.

After AEK, he went to Atromitos in whose colors he greatly stabilized his performance and had a very good presence for six years, and also scoring 1 goal with a penalty. With Atromitos he reached the cup final in 2011, where they faced his former club, AEK and lost 3–0. After Atromitos, he played in AEL and Panionios before ending his career in 2012.

International career
Michailidis has played once for Greece in a friendly match against Finland, coming in as a substitute. National manager Fernando Santos also called him in August 2010 for the Euro 2012 qualifying games against Georgia and Croatia.

After football
In the summer of 2013, Michailidis returned to AEK taking over as goalkeeper coach of the team's academies. In July 2022 he was assigned at AEK Athens B with the same role.

Honours

AEK Athens
Greek Cup: 1999–2000

References

External links
Insports.gr profile 

1975 births
Living people
Greek footballers
Greece international footballers
Super League Greece players
AEK Athens F.C. players
Ethnikos Asteras F.C. players
Atromitos F.C. players
Athlitiki Enosi Larissa F.C. players
Panionios F.C. players
Association football goalkeepers
AEK F.C. non-playing staff
Footballers from Ptolemaida